The Bayer designation Phi Orionis (φ Ori, φ Orionis) is shared by two star systems in the constellation Orion. 

 Phi1 Orionis
 Phi2 Orionis

The two stars are separated by approximately 0.71° in the sky.

Etymology

Both of φ Ori and λ Ori were Al Haḳʽah, "a White Spot".

(for φ2Ori)

References 

Orionis, Phi
Orion (constellation)